Marshal of the Empire was a civil dignity during the First French Empire. It was created by Sénatus-consulte on 18 May 1804 and to a large extent reinstated the formerly abolished title of Marshal of France. According to the Sénatus-consulte, a Marshal was a grand officer of the Empire, entitled to a high-standing position at the Court and to the presidency of an electoral college.

Although in theory reserved "to the most distinguished generals", in practice Emperor Napoleon I granted the title according to his own wishes and convictions and made at least a few controversial choices. Although not a military rank, a Marshal displayed four silver stars, while the top military rank, General of Division, displayed three stars. Furthermore, the Marshalate quickly became the prestigious sign of the supreme military attainment and it became customary that the most significant commands be given to a Marshal. Each Marshal held his own coat of arms, was entitled to special honours and several of them held top functions within the army. They wore distinctive uniforms and were entitled to carry a baton, which was a symbol of their authority.

Throughout his reign from 1804 to 1815, Napoleon appointed a total of 26 Marshals, although their number never exceeded 20 at any one moment. The initial list of 1804 included 14 names of active generals and four names of retired generals, who were given the "honorary" title of Marshal. Six other promotions ensued, with eight other generals elevated to the Marshalate. The title often ensured a highly privileged social status – four Marshals were created Counts of the Empire and 17 received either the title of Duke or Prince. With two exceptions – Jean-Baptiste Bessières and Jean-Mathieu-Philibert Sérurier – the Marshals led a sumptuous lifestyle and left behind significant, at times immense, fortunes. Several of them received significant annuities; in addition, a few received financial endowments from the Emperor, with two of them – Louis-Alexandre Berthier and André Masséna – receiving more than one million Francs each. Two Marshals – Joachim Murat and Jean-Baptiste Bernadotte – went on to become Kings, with the latter being the direct ancestor of the current Swedish Royal Family.

Most of the Marshals held significant commands during the Napoleonic Wars, winning some of the most brilliant victories of the entire Napoleonic Wars. Three of them – Jean Lannes, Louis-Nicolas Davout and Louis-Gabriel Suchet were virtually never defeated in pitched battle, despite fighting in dozens of engagements. While they were not normally expected to lead from the front, they often exposed themselves to great dangers on the battlefields of Europe; three Marshals – Jean Lannes, Jean-Baptiste Bessières and Józef Poniatowski – were killed in action or died as a result of battle wounds. During his five years as a Marshal of the Empire (1809–1814), Nicolas-Charles Oudinot received seven of a total of 34 battle wounds suffered throughout his career, but went on to live to the then venerable age of 81. Often formidable when serving under the direct command of Napoleon, the Marshals proved to be less effective when having to cooperate in the Emperor's absence. Some repeatedly acted in bad faith when placed under the command of another Marshal, with conflicts sometimes leading to fatal military consequences. After Napoleon's downfall, most of them swore allegiance to the Bourbon Restoration and several went on to hold significant commands and positions.

Origins

The French word Maréchal traces its origins back to the Carolingians, from the Ancient German word marascahl, a stable supervisor who took care of the king's horses. With the growing importance of the battle horse during the early Middle Age, the role came to acquire some prestige and began to be known as Marshal of France. Albéric Clément, who led King Philippe-Auguste's vanguard during the victory over the English at Bouvines in 1214, was the first recorded incumbent. At first, the role was granted to a single person, but three decades after Bouvines, Louis IX of France set sail for the 1248 Crusade with two Marshals. As early as the 15th century, the Marshals no longer cared for the King's horses and stables, and were simply military leaders, a role that they would retain through to modern times. Although the position remained highly prestigious, their number grew throughout the centuries, with Louis XIV naming as many as 51 Marshals during his 72-year reign. In the years leading to the French Revolution, there were constantly 15–16 Marshals, but a law of 4 March 1791 reduced their number to six and a decree of 21 February 1793 abolished the dignity altogether.

Eleven years later, Napoleon Bonaparte became Emperor of the French and wanted to institute a military elite for the new French Empire. Article 48 of Title of the 19 May 1804 sénatus-consulte set up the grand officers of the Empire, among which the highest-standing were the Marshals. In the Imperial Court hierarchy, they came in the fifth rank, behind the Emperor and Empress, the Imperial family, the great dignitaries and the ministers. They were entitled to a special etiquette: whenever the Emperor would write to them, he would call them Mon Cousin ("Cousin"), when a third party would write to them, they would be called Monsieur le Maréchal; and when spoken to, they would be called Monseigneur ("My Liege"). They were greeted with 13 cannon shots when at their headquarters and 11 when away. They were also entitled to their own personal coat of arms.

Although a purely civil dignity reserved to distinguished generals and not a military rank, a Marshal displayed four stars, while the top military rank of the time, the General of Division displayed three. Contrary to a well-established idea and to the representation on most paintings of the time, the Marshal's four stars were silvered, not gilded. A Marshal was required to wear a standard uniform, which was established through decree on 18 July 1804 and designed by painter Jean-Baptiste Isabey and designer Charles Percier. Nevertheless, the Marshals often chose to wear either variants of the official uniform or costumes of totally different design. The ultimate distinctive sign of a Marshal was his baton. It was cylindrical, 50 centimetres long and 4 centimetres and a half in diameter, made of wood and covered in dark blue velvet, decorated with golden eagles or honey bees, both Imperial symbols.

Promotions

The creation of the new civil dignity allowed Napoleon to strengthen his newly created regime by rewarding the most valuable of the generals who had served under his command during his campaigns in Italy and Egypt or soldiers who had held significant commands during the French Revolutionary Wars. Subsequently, other senior generals were promoted on six occasions, mainly following major battlefield victories. With hindsight, Napoleon's choices for the Marshalate were not always well inspired.

First promotion (1804)

The first promotion created eighteen new Marshals of the Empire and coincided with the proclamation of the First French Empire and was used as an opportunity for the new Emperor to strengthen the new regime. The list included 14 names of generals who had served in the armies of the Republic during the French Revolutionary Wars: seven of them were generals who had served directly under Napoleon during his campaigns in Italy and Egypt. Moreover, he was also careful to reward several general officers who had acquired considerable fame and political influence while commanding the armies of the Republic, as well as several highly-promising generals who had held significant divisional commands in the Army of the Rhine. The latter were well known for their largely Republican sentiments and had never served under Napoleon's command. By rewarding them for their military accomplishments, Napoleon sought to gain their loyalty and make sure that they would be supporters, rather than opponents of the new Imperial regime.

Overall, the first promotion included 14 names of generals. An initial list was drafted by State Secretary Henri Jacques Guillaume Clarke and later altered by the Emperor. Napoleon added in his own handwriting Murat's name, which was conspicuously absent from Clarke's draft. This was possibly an omission, but there seems to be no evidence to that effect. The final list included the following names, in an order which to this day remains unclear:

Louis-Alexandre Berthier, an experienced soldier of the Ancien Régime, a part of the French Expeditionary Corps during the American Revolutionary War, who had become Napoleon's ‘indispensable’ chief of staff, creating a complex staff system mainly composed of three groups that proved highly effective
Joachim Murat, who had married Napoleon's sister, Caroline, and subsequently made a name for himself under the command of his brother-in-law as a dashing cavalry commander. Later made King of Naples. 
Bon-Adrien Jeannot de Moncey, a competent if unexceptional soldier, who had been the commander-in-chief of the French army that defeated Spain and forced it out of the First Coalition
Jean-Baptiste Jourdan, the hero of Fleurus, a staunch Republican, and held significant commands and campaigned on the Rhine
André Masséna, a dogged and tenacious soldier, one of Napoleon's former senior divisional commanders from the First Italian Campaign and who subsequently acquired considerable reputation as an independent commander of armies
Pierre Augereau, a skilled tactician, another of Napoleon's senior divisional commanders of the First Italian Campaign
Jean-Baptiste Bernadotte, served as Minister of War and ambassador to Austria under the Directory, he was one of Jourdan's divisional commanders in the Army of the Rhine and himself a Republican, who also fought with Napoleon in Italy as a divisional commander, and commander of the Army of the West during the Consulate
Guillaume Brune, a fierce Republican, he had been friends with the journalist Jean-Paul Marat and risen to become an influential soldier and diplomat who was the hero of the Battle of Castricum. 
Jean-de-Dieu Soult, a dependable commander and organizer, who had served under Jourdan and Jean Victor Marie Moreau and became Masséna's right-hand man during the 1799–1800 campaigns
Jean Lannes, a distinguished soldier who proved courageous in Italy and Egypt, rising to become a General of Division and commandant of the consular guard
Édouard Mortier, a capable commander who served with great distinction during the War of the Second Coalition at Zurich and Hanover
Michel Ney, an excellent cavalry officer who distinguished himself in the War of the First Coalition
Louis-Nicolas Davout, perhaps Napoleon's finest general, a Republican and a commander in the consular guard and already had an impressive record, also serving in the Egyptian Expedition, although there were rumors that Davout had actually risen to the rank of Marshal because of the deaths of two of his patrons (General Desaix; at Marengo, and Charles Leclerc; died of yellow fever in Haiti)
Jean-Baptiste Bessières, a fine cavalry commander, and one of Napoleon's closest friends

Four additional names were mentioned on the list: these were former senior generals who had held commands of armies and had been elected senators of the Republic. Their status was honorary due to their age and they weren't set to be given field commands.

François Christophe de Kellermann, the oldest marshal chosen by Napoleon, supposedly honorary but in fact, Kellermann proved one of Napoleons most effective at handling reserve-class forces.
François Joseph Lefebvre, who continued to serve as field commander
Catherine-Dominique de Pérignon, who fought in the Pyrenees frontier against Spain, winning several key victories, but retiring from military command shortly before becoming a Marshal, never held active military command again
Jean-Mathieu-Philibert Sérurier, a close friend and supporter of Georges Danton, making him politically useful for Napoleon

Second promotion (1807)

Claude Victor-Perrin, a skilled commander, who had served under Napoleon in the Siege of Toulon, in which he personally drove the British back into the sea, not to mention for his valor during the Italian Campaign. Made a Marshal for his performance at the Battle of Friedland

Third promotion (1809)

Three new marshals were created in the aftermath of the Battle of Wagram.
Jacques MacDonald, the only Marshal of the Empire to be promoted on a battlefield, and was Napoleon's choice for “France”
Nicolas Charles Oudinot, Napoleon's choice for the “Army” 
Auguste de Marmont, was the choice of “friendship,” probably to Napoleon

Fourth promotion (1811)

Louis-Gabriel Suchet, one of the most prominent and successful marshals of the Napoleonic Wars and the only Marshal to gain his baton in the Peninsular Wars after his Victory at Taragona.

Fifth promotion (1812)

Laurent de Gouvion Saint-Cyr was made a Marshal after routing a Russian army at Polotsk, defending the French spearhead which was driving towards Moscow. This, in recognition, Napoleon made him a Marshal.

Sixth promotion (1813)

Józef Antoni Poniatowski was a firm supporter of Napoleon and participated in the Invasion of Russia. He was among the rearguard at the disastrous Battle of Leipzig and was drowned, having only served as Marshal of the Empire for three days. He was the first and only Marshal of Napoleon who was not French. He was a member of the House of Poniatowski.

Seventh promotion (1815)

Emmanuel de Grouchy was made a Marshal at the latter stages of Napoleon's military career. A capable cavalry general throughout the Napoleonic wars, Grouchy was made a Marshal before the 100 days. He was widely blamed for not joining with Napoleon for the Battle of Waterloo, getting himself into unnecessary battles with Prussian field commander, Von Blücher.

Controversies

Among the men who were offered the Marshalate, there was a mix of famous generals, who had commanded the armies of the Republic (Brune, Jourdan, Kellermann, Lefebvre, Masséna, Moncey), as well as more junior generals, whose command never exceeded division-sized forces (Mortier, Ney, Soult). It even included relatively obscure generals from Napoleon's Italian or Egyptian expeditions, who had recently secured their promotion to the top military rank of General of Division, but had never held significant commands (Bessières, Davout, Lannes). Unsurprisingly, this created a certain degree of discontentment among the more senior commanders. André Masséna was noted for his sardonic remark, "There's fourteen of us...", which he muttered when his friends came to congratulate him for his nomination. Auguste Frédéric Louis Viesse de Marmont, then a young general, possibly bitter that he had not been nominated also observed that: "If Bessières is a Marshal, then anyone can be." Ironically, Marmont himself was made a Marshal of the Empire in 1809, though it was said he was awarded the distinction for his close friendship with Napoleon as opposed to any great generalship.

List of the 26 Marshals of the Empire

See also

Grand Marshal of the Palace
Eugene de Beuharnais
List of French generals of the Revolutionary and Napoleonic Wars
Marshal of Holland

References

1804 establishments in France
1815 disestablishments in France